The Kerinchi LRT station is a Kelana Jaya LRT station in Kuala Lumpur. The station, which is named after Kampung Kerinchi, a village within walking distance, is located inside Plaza Pantai (officially being redeveloped as Bangsar Trade Centre), a mixed commercial complex near Jalan Pantai Baru.

The station is linked to Bangsar South Trade Centre by an 800m long pedestrian bridge spanning across the Federal Highway.

The station also offers a facility for reloading the Touch 'n Go card at the Maybank ATM and CIMB ATM.

Around the station
 Kerinchi Pylon
 Telekom Tower

Bus services

References 

Choong, Mek Zhin (2012). "Pantai Plaza rebranded as Bangsar Trade Centre to house wholesale mall." The Star, Metro4. Retrieved 5 June 2012.

Kelana Jaya Line
Railway stations opened in 1998